Greg Daniels (born 27 August 1963) is a former Australian rules footballer who played for Collingwood in the Victorian Football League (VFL) in 1986. He was recruited from Sea Lake.

References

External links

Living people
1963 births
Collingwood Football Club players
Place of birth missing (living people)
Australian rules footballers from Victoria (Australia)